Jearoldstown is an unincorporated community in northeastern Greene County, Tennessee.
Jearoldstown is located off Interstate 81 exit 44, between Fall Branch and Baileyton.

References

Unincorporated communities in Greene County, Tennessee
Unincorporated communities in Tennessee